Cudgel (1914–1941) was an American two-time Champion Thoroughbred racehorse.

Trained by future U.S. Racing Hall of Fame inductee H. Guy Bedwell, Cudgel is probably best remembered for his win in the 1919 Havre de Grace Handicap in which he defeated two future Hall of Fame inductees, Exterminator and Sir Barton.

Cudgel's racing record is incomplete, especially at ages two and three when he raced primarily in "the west" (a term then used for racetracks in Kentucky and other states away from the East Coast). At age two in 1916, he won the Hamburg Place and Mt. Lookout Handicaps and was third in the Glenview Handicap. At age three, he won the Latonia Independence and Madisonville Handicaps, and was second in the Latonia Derby. He finished eleventh in the 1917 Kentucky Derby. In August, he was purchased by Canadian J. K. L. Ross for $30,000.

At age four in 1918, Cudgel was relocated to the east coast where he developed into the champion older horse of the year, winning five major stakes races. In the Pimlico Spring Handicap on May 8, he beat Omar Khayyam, the previous year's three-year-old champion. On May 19, he beat Spur in the Kings County Handicap. He briefly returned to Kentucky where he won the Kentucky Handicap on June 1. Travelling back to New York, he beat future Hall of Famer Roamer in the Brooklyn Handicap on June 24 while carrying top weight of 129 pounds. On August 16, he set an American record of 1:56 for  miles while winning the Schenectady Handicap at Saratoga by a nose over Westy Hogan. He carried 131 pounds in the race, 5 pounds more than Westy Hogan. After this, he lost several races but returned to form in the Liberty Handicap on September 27, winning handily despite conceding 48 pounds to the runner-up. After another loss, he finished the season by winning the Dixie Handicap at Laurel racetrack "with ridiculous ease" over Midway and Omar Khayyam.

The next year, despite a long layoff between May and August as a result of an injury, he came back to share Champion Older Horse honors with Sun Briar.

After retiring from racing, Cudgel stood at stud Ross's Yarrow Brae Stud near Laurel, Maryland. A successful sire, his best offspring were Fluvanna, 1923 American Champion Two-Year-Old Filly, and Froth Blower, who won the 1931 King's Plate, Canada's most prestigious race.

Cudgel died in October 1941 at age twenty-seven.

References

 Cudgel racing and offspring statistics at The Triple Crown database
 August 16, 1919 New York Times article on Cudgel's win in the Hudson Handicap at Saratoga Race Course

1914 racehorse births
1941 racehorse deaths
Thoroughbred family 4-a
Racehorses bred in New Jersey
Racehorses trained in the United States
American Champion racehorses